Christian Brink (born 17 March 1983) is a Norwegian retired footballer who played as a central defender. After playing for Stord/Moster in the lower leagues, Brink has played for Sogndal, Lyn, GIF Sundsvall and Sarpsborg 08.

Career
Brink made his senior debut at the age of 17, and played for the local club Stord/Moster at the third and the fourth tier. He started socionom-studies in Sogndal in the summer of 2005, and travelled home to Stord to play matches in the Second Division while he was training with the First Division side Sogndal IL's first-team. Brink signed a two-year contract with Sogndal ahead of the 2006-season, and was bought by the Tippeligaen side Lyn a half-year later. With a transfer-fee of 4,4 million NOK, he became the then most expensive player at Lyn. He made his debut on 27 August 2006 against Sandefjord. He played all but three league games in 2007, but no games in 2008 and only two games in 2009. His last league game was on 24 May 2009.

Brink then signed for GIF Sundsvall in the summer of 2009, where he was a regular starter for the team in Superettan. Following GIF Sundsvall promotion, Brink played 10 matches in Allsvenskan before he joined the Norwegian First Division side Sarpsborg 08 in August 2012. In mid-2014 he returned to Stord.

Career statistics

References

External links 
 Eliteprospects profile

1983 births
Living people
People from Stord
Norwegian footballers
Stord IL players
Sogndal Fotball players
Lyn Fotball players
GIF Sundsvall players
Sarpsborg 08 FF players
Norwegian First Division players
Eliteserien players
Superettan players
Allsvenskan players
Norwegian expatriate footballers
Norwegian expatriate sportspeople in Sweden
Expatriate footballers in Sweden
Association football defenders
Sportspeople from Vestland